Ho Sakta Hai! is a 2006 Indian horror film directed by Wilson Louis and produced by Ashok Kotwani. The film stars Khalid Siddiqui, Hazel Crowney, Victor Banerjee in important roles. The film focuses on a family living their lives peacefully until they discover that they are falling prey to black magic. The film was screened in many international film festivals, albeit was a "major flop" at the Indian box-office.

Cast
 Khalid Siddiqui as Dr. Mohan 
 Hazel Crowney as Claire
 Victor Banerjee as Mohan's grandfather
 Mukesh Tiwari as Kushaba (face reader)
 Neena Kulkarni as Shakuntala
 Jaya Bhattacharya as Snehal
 Pinky Campbell as Parvati (credited as Mohini)
 Master Dharmik as Tanya (Mohan's son)

Critical reviews
Taran Adarsh from Bollywood Hungama rated the film 1.5 out of 5 praising Banerjee's performance along with Khalid and Hazel. Joginder Tuteja from IndiaGlitz praised the visual effects of the film. Parbina Rashid from The Tribune praised the performances of Banerjee and Mohini (Campbell).

Accolades
Ho Sakta Hai was screened at Cannes Film Festival (2005) and Filmpur Film Festival in England (2005). The film was nominated within Best Three Films at the FICCI Awards. and won a Seagate Technical Award for Best Visual Effects.

References

External links
 
 Ho Sakta Hai at WilsonLouisFilms portal
 Ho Sakta Hai at Bollywood Hungama

2000s horror thriller films
Indian horror thriller films
2005 horror films
2005 films
Films about witchcraft
2000s mystery thriller films
Indian mystery thriller films
2000s Hindi-language films